Xena is the main character of Xena: Warrior Princess.

Xena may also be used for:
Xena (software), archiving software
Xēna or Lisa Fischer, R&B musician
Xena, the provisional name for Eris (dwarf planet)
Xena, Saskatchewan, an unincorporated area in Canada
Xena (genus), a fly genus
Xena (moth), a name formerly used for the moth genus Netoxena before it was realized that the name had already been used

See also
 
 Zena (disambiguation)
 Xenia (disambiguation)
 Xenu, a figure in Scientology beliefs